Marsyas is a satyr who had a music contest with Apollo.

Marsyas may also refer to:
 Marsyas (horse), a French Thoroughbred racehorse
 Marsyas (beetle), a genus of beetles in the family Carabidae
 Pseudolycaena marsyas, a species of butterfly
 Marsyas (sculpture), a sculpture
 343158 Marsyas, an Apollo asteroid on a retrograde orbit

People
 Marsyas Painter (4th century BC), attic vase painter
 Marsyas of Pella (356-294), historian
 Marsyas of Philippi (3rd century BC), historian